Pappalysin-2 also known as pregnancy-associated plasma protein A2 (PAPP-A2) is a protein that in humans is encoded by the PAPPA2 gene.

References

Further reading